The Lunca Joasă a Prutului Inferior Natural Park is a protected area (natural park category V IUCN) situated in Romania, in Galați County.

Location 
The Natural Park is situated in the inferior course of Prut River, in the administrative territory of Berești-Meria, Nicorești, Cavadinești, Oancea, Suceveni, Vlădeşti, Tulucești, Vânători communes, in the north-eastern part of Galați county.

Description 
The Lunca Joasă a Prutului Inferior with an area of 8.247 ha was declared natural protected area by the Government Decision Number 2152 on November 30, 2004 (published in Romanian Official Paper Number 38 on January 12, 2005) and represents a wetland (with canals, lakes, swamps, floodplains) of internacional importance  especially for waterfowl habitat, or mammals, fish and plant species

Protected areas included in park: Ostrovul Prut, Pochina Lake and Vlășcuța Lake.

References 

Protected areas of Romania
Geography of Galați County
Protected areas established in 2005
Tourist attractions in Galați County